Scopula gibbivalvata is a moth of the  family Geometridae. It is found on Madagascar.

References

Moths described in 1972
gibbivalvata
Moths of Madagascar